The Committee for Truth in Politics first began running ads during the 2008 United States presidential election. and most recently, in 2010, has been running ads opposing financial reforms and targeting Democrats.

History
The conservative group has received substantial media coverage for its advertising campaigns. The organization was founded in North Carolina, and has filed a suit to protect it from an FEC investigation and enforcement action for running a political ad. The organization has sponsored advertisements against Barack Obama.

See also
 RightChange.com
 American Issues Project

References

Political advocacy groups in the United States